Justin McCully (born February 18, 1976) is a retired American professional mixed martial artist and professional wrestler who most recently competed in the Heavyweight division of the RFA. A professional competitor since 1997, McCully has also formerly competed for the UFC, RINGS, Pancrase, It's Showtime and Jungle Fight.

Mixed martial arts career
McCully trains with Team Punishment, including Tito Ortiz, Kendall Grove, and professional wrestler Samoa Joe.  McCully also trained with BJ Penn in Hilo for Penn's bout with Georges St-Pierre at UFC 94.  He has three previous fights inside the UFC, a unanimous decision victory over Antoni Hardonk at UFC Fight Night 9, a submission loss to Gabriel Gonzaga at UFC 86, and a unanimous decision win over Eddie Sanchez at UFC: Fight For The Troops.  McCully was also scheduled to fight Christian Wellisch at UFC 76, but McCully was ultimately replaced by Scott Junk. He has also fought a former UFC champion, losing to Evan Tanner by technical submission at a 1998 Pancrase event.

McCully competed against Gabriel Gonzaga at UFC 86.  He lost by submission to Gonzaga applying an Americana keylock from the mounted position in the first round.

He then fought Eddie Sanchez at UFC: Fight for the Troops and won the fight by unanimous decision. Most recently, McCully lost to Mike Russow at UFC 102 via unanimous decision.

After his defeat at the hands of Mike Russow at UFC 102, McCully was released by the organization.

Personal life
Justin has two children, and is also good friends with professional wrestler Rob Van Dam. In 2014 he had a falling out with Tito Ortiz over what McCully claimed was Ortiz owing him money and refusing to pay him back. This fallout culminated with McCully openly supporting and training with Stephan Bonnar who was Ortiz' opponent at Bellator 131. McCully's brother, Sean, is a former professional kickboxer and MMA fighter.

Mixed martial arts record

|-
| Win
| align=center| 11–5–2
| Justin Grizzard
| TKO (punches)
| RFA 1: Elliot vs. Pulver
| 
| align=center| 1
| align=center| 2:45
| Kearney, Nebraska, United States
| 
|-
| Loss
| align=center| 10–5–2
| Mike Russow
| Decision (unanimous)
| UFC 102
| 
| align=center| 3
| align=center| 5:00
| Portland, Oregon, United States
| 
|-
| Win
| align=center| 
| Eddie Sanchez
| Decision (unanimous)
| UFC: Fight For The Troops
| 
| align=center| 3
| align=center| 5:00
| Fayetteville, North Carolina, United States
| 
|-
| Loss
| align=center| 9–4–2
| Gabriel Gonzaga
| Submission (americana)
| UFC 86
| 
| align=center| 1
| align=center| 1:57
| Las Vegas, Nevada, United States
| 
|-
| Win
| align=center| 9–3–2
| Antoni Hardonk
| Decision (unanimous)
| UFC Fight Night: Stevenson vs. Guillard
| 
| align=center| 3
| align=center| 5:00
| Las Vegas, Nevada, United States
| 
|-
| Win
| align=center| 8–3–2
| Ruben Villareal
| Submission (front choke)
| Valor Fighting: San Manuel
| 
| align=center| 1
| align=center| 3:48
| San Bernardino, California, United States
| 
|-
| Win
| align=center| 7–3–2
| Derek Thornton
| Submission (rear-naked choke)
| Extreme Wars 5: Battlegrounds
| 
| align=center| 1
| align=center| 2:20
| Honolulu, Hawaii, United States
| 
|-
| Win
| align=center| 6–3–2
| Ed de Kruijf
| Submission (armbar)
| Venom: First Strike 
| 
| align=center| 1
| align=center| 0:48
| Huntington Beach, California, United States
| 
|-
| Win
| align=center| 5–3–2
| Dario Amorim
| Decision (unanimous)
| Jungle Fight 1
| 
| align=center| 3
| align=center| 5:00
| Manaus, Brazil
| 
|-
| Loss
| align=center| 4–3–2
| Ed de Kruijf
| Submission (reverse full-nelson)
| It's Showtime: Exclusive
| 
| align=center| 1
| align=center| 2:36
| Haarlem, Netherlands
| 
|-
| Win
| align=center| 4–2–2
| Errol Maduro
| Submission
| UFO Europe: Free Fight Gala
| 
| align=center| N/A
| align=center| N/A
| Kijkduin, Netherlands
| 
|-
| Loss
| align=center| 3–2–2
| Mikhail Ilyukhin
| Technical Submission (achilles lock)
| RINGS: King of Kings 1999 Block A
| 
| align=center| 1
| align=center| 4:48
| Tokyo, Japan
| 
|-
| Win
| align=center| 3–1–2
| Mario Neto
| Submission (kneebar)
| WVC 9: World Vale Tudo Championship 9
| 
| align=center| 1
| align=center| 1:53
| Aruba
| 
|-
| Loss
| align=center| 2–1–2
| Evan Tanner
| Technical Submission (kimura)
| Pancrase: 1998 Neo-Blood Tournament, Round 2
| 
| align=center| 1
| align=center| 5:07
| Aomori, Japan
| 
|-
| Win
| align=center| 2–0–2
|  Martin Emmen
| Submission (armbar)
| Pancrase: 1998 Neo-Blood Tournament, Round 1
| 
| align=center| 1
| align=center| 1:34
| Tokyo, Japan
| 
|-
| Win
| align=center| 1–0–2
| Daisuke Ishii
| Decision (unanimous)
| Pancrase: 1998 Neo-Blood Tournament, Round 1
| 
| align=center| 2
| align=center| 3:00
| Tokyo, Japan
| 
|-
|  Draw
| align=center| 0–0–2
| Daisuke Ishii
| Draw (unanimous)
| Pancrase: Alive 4
| 
| align=center| 2
| align=center| 3:00
| Tokyo, Japan
| 
|-
|  Draw
| align=center| 0–0–1
| Kenji Akiyama
| Draw
| Daidojuku: Wars 4
| 
| align=center| 5
| align=center| 3:00
| Tokyo, Japan
|

Championships and accomplishments in professional wrestling
World Wrestling Council
WWC World Junior Heavyweight Championship (1 time)
International Wrestling Association
IWA Intercontinental Heavyweight Championship (1 time)
Ultimate Pro Wrestling
UPW Tag Team Championship (2 times) - with Hardkore Kidd

References

External links
 
 

American male mixed martial artists
American male professional wrestlers
Heavyweight mixed martial artists
Mixed martial artists utilizing wrestling
Sportspeople from Washington, D.C.
1979 births
Living people
Ultimate Fighting Championship male fighters